Sick Room Records Ltd. (often referred to as Sickroom) was an independent record label based in Chicago, Illinois.  The label was founded in 2001 by Mitch Cheney and Steve Sostak of the band Sweep the Leg Johnny and Ryan Duncan. The label was known to put out releases that can fall into the categories of indie rock, post rock, math rock, noise rock and punk rock among others. The label closed in 2017.

Roster

 Alexis Gideon
 AM Syndicate
 The Afflictions
 The Ants
 Bear Claw
 Bottles And Skulls
 Che Arthur
 Check Engine
 Cheval De Frise
 Chevreuil
 The Conformists
 Detective Instinct
 Dilute
 The Distances
 Drums & Tuba
 Form And Mess
 Form Of Rocket
 Freddie T. And The People
 The Gary
 Greenness
 Hella
 Hyrrokkin
 Instrumental Quarter
 The Julius Airwave
 Just A Fire
 Kash
 King Champion Sounds
 Kippi's
 L'Ocelle Mare
 Lozenge
 Martha's Vineyard Ferries
 Marvin
 Mass Shivers
 Mike Lust
 Papier Tigre
 Passe Montagne
 Pink Mountain
 Phantom Works
 Princess
 Push-Pull
 Quatre Tete
 Radiant Republic
 Rockets Red Glare
 Runner
 Sleepytime Gorilla Museum
 Sweep the Leg Johnny
 Ten Grand
 Them Roaring Twenties
 Three Second Kiss
 Tic Code
 Transmontane
 Triclops!
 We Ride On

See also
 List of record labels
 Independent record labels

External links
 Official site
 Sick Room Records Myspace page

Record labels established in 2001
American independent record labels
Indie rock record labels
Alternative rock record labels
Noise music record labels
Companies based in Chicago